or  is a municipality in Troms og Finnmark county, Norway. The administrative centre of the municipality is the village of Tana bru. Among the other villages in the municipality are Austertana, Bonakas, Polmak, Rustefjelbma, and Skiippagurra.

The  municipality is the 5th largest by area out of the 356 municipalities in Norway. Deanu-Tana is the 236th most populous municipality in Norway with a population of 2,821.

History

The municipality of Tana was established on 1 January 1864 when the eastern part of the large municipality of Lebesby was separated to become a new municipality with a population of 1,388. The original municipality included all the land on both sides surrounding the Tanafjorden and the Tana River.

On 1 January 1914, the municipality of Tana was divided into three parts. The southern part (population: 1,426) remained as (a smaller) Tana Municipality. The northern part of the municipality was divided by the Tanafjorden with the western side becoming Gamvik Municipality (population: 1,374) and the eastern side becoming Berlevåg Municipality (population: 784). On 1 January 1964, the neighboring municipality of Polmak (population: 1,072), which had separated from Nesseby Municipality on 1 January 1903, was merged into Tana.

Tana Municipality marks the furthest Soviet advance into Nazi-occupied Norway.

On 1 January 2020, the municipality became part of the newly formed Troms og Finnmark county. Previously, it had been part of the old Finnmark county.

Name
Tana is a Norwegianized form of the Northern Sami name Deanu. The Sami name is identical with the Sami word deanu which means "great river" or "main river", referring to the main river (Tana River) which runs through the municipality. Prior to 1918, the name was written "Tanen".

On 1 September 1992, the name of the municipality was changed to "Deatnu-Tana" to symbolize the two official languages in the municipality. Then in 2005, the name was again changed such that either Deatnu or Tana can be used. The Sami name was changed from Deatnu to Deanu in 2021.

Coat of arms
The coat of arms was granted on 11 May 1984. The official blazon is "Gules, three boats Or in pale". This means the arms have a red field (background) and the charge is three riverboats. The riverboat has a tincture of Or which means it is commonly colored yellow, but if it is made out of metal, then gold is used. The red and yellow colors in the arms were chosen to mimic the Norwegian national arms. The three riverboats were chosen because boats like this have been used in the area for centuries. There are three boats to symbolize the three ethnic groups in the border municipality: the Sámi, Kvens, and Norwegians. The arms were designed by Arvid Sveen.

Economy
In 2013, 29% of the work force was employed in retail, hotels/restaurants and finance; 23% in the healthcare industry and the social sector; 16% in the Secondary sector of the economy; 11% in the primary sector; 9% worked in the education sector; the work force totaled 1,401.

The most important [economic] resources are farmland and [coastal areas, mountains and forests or] utmark; the use of these gives [significant results relating to] agriculture.

The world's northernmost dairy is Tine Tana, and it employs around 30 people.

Churches
The Church of Norway has two parishes within the municipality of Tana. It is part of the Indre Finnmark prosti (deanery) in the Diocese of Nord-Hålogaland.

Government
All municipalities in Norway, including Deatnu-Tana, are responsible for primary education (through 10th grade), outpatient health services, senior citizen services, unemployment and other social services, zoning, economic development, and municipal roads. The municipality is governed by a municipal council of elected representatives, which in turn elect a mayor.  The municipality falls under the Indre Finnmark District Court and the Hålogaland Court of Appeal.

Municipal council
The municipal council  of Deatnu-Tana is made up of 19 representatives that are elected to four year terms. The party breakdown of the council is as follows:

Geography

Deatnu-Tana is situated along the lower river basin of the Tana River, which borders Finland along most of its course. People live in small settlements along the river, notably Sirma, Polmak, Rustefjelbma, Seida, Skiippagurra, Austertana, and Tana bru. Most inhabitants of Tana are Sami people, and the Sami language and culture are today promoted by the municipality and the schools.

The river Tana has represented a mainstay in the economy, as it is one of Europe's main salmon rivers, and it empties into the Tanafjorden. River transportation is traditionally done by long, narrow river boats, that are still in use, albeit motorized. Lakes in this area include Geassájávri, Nissojávri, and Sundvatnet. At Tana bru, the Tana Bridge (part of European route E6 and European route E75) crosses over the Tana River. Kirkenes Airport (but not Vadsø) has direct flights to Oslo.

Wildlife
With the Tana River flowing through wild and spectacular habitat, the municipality of Tana has one of the most spectacular gatherings in Norway. As many as 25,000 goosanders can accumulate along the Tana waterway system. Add to this, thousands of common eider and long-tailed duck, then you have one of the largest concentrations of wildfowl in Norway.

In 2022 one bear was killed because of deaths of sheep from a local farm. After an investigation, it was determined that the killing of the bear was legal, and it was also found that it is likely that there had been at least one other bear in the municipality.

Climate
Tana has a subarctic climate (Dfc) with long, cold winters and short cool summers.

Notable people 

 Halvdan Wexelsen Freihow (1883 in Tana – 1965) a Norwegian priest and culturist
 Per Fokstad (1890 in Tana – 1973) a teacher, politician, and intellectual of Sami origin
 Kathrine Johnsen (1917 in Tana – 2002) a Sámi teacher and worked for NRK Sápmi
 Kristen Kyrre Bremer (1925 in Tana – 2013) theologian and bishop in the Church of Norway
 Nils Utsi (1943 in Tana – 2019) a Norwegian Sámi actor, stage director and film director 
 Ella Marie Hætta Isaksen (born 1998 in Tana) a Norwegian Sami musician

Writers 
 Reidar Hirsti (1925 in Tana – 2001) a newspaper editor, politician and author of books about historical or Sami topics
 Nils Jernsletten (1934 in Tana –  2012) a professor of Sámi at University of Tromsø and editor of Sámi newspaper Ságat
 Marry A. Somby (born 1953 in Tana) a Sami author
 Hanne Ørstavik (born 1969 in Tana ) is a Norwegian writer
 Siri Broch Johansen (born 1967 in Tana) a Sami author, singer, and textbook author

Sport 
 Martin Schanche (born 1945), nicknamed Mister Rallycross, a former racing driver and politician, brought up inTana
 Sigleif Johansen (born 1948 in Tana) a former Norwegian biathlete
 Signe Trosten (born 1970 in Tana) a former Norwegian biathlete
 Signe Marie Store (born 1995 in Tana) a Norwegian freestyle wrestler

References

External links

Deatnu-Tana. Statistics Norway

 
Municipalities of Troms og Finnmark
Sámi-language municipalities
1864 establishments in Norway
Populated places of Arctic Norway